Rhampholeon platyceps, the Mount Mulanje pygmy chameleon or Malawi stumptail chameleon, is a species of chameleon found in Malawi and Mozambique.

References

Rhampholeon
Reptiles described in 1893
Taxa named by Albert Günther
Reptiles of Malawi
Reptiles of Mozambique